[[

]]

McNiven Farm Complex is a historic home and barn complex located at Guilderland in Albany County, New York.  The original house was built about 1790 and is a small Dutch house that is located to the rear of the present structure.  A substantial addition was completed in the mid-19th century.  It is a two-story, five bay wide farmhouse with a center entrance and gable roof. Also on the property is a vernacular barn complex.

It was listed on the National Register of Historic Places in 1982.

References

Houses on the National Register of Historic Places in New York (state)
Houses completed in 1790
Houses in Albany County, New York
National Register of Historic Places in Albany County, New York